Édouard Lantéri (31 October 1848 – 22 December 1917) was a French-born British sculptor and medallist whose romantic French style of sculpting was seen as influential among exponents of New Sculpture. His name is also frequently spelled without accents as Edouard Lanteri and his first name sometimes given in its English form as Edward.

Biography
Lantéri was born in Auxerre, France but later took British nationality. He studied art in the studios of François-Joseph Duret and Aimé Millet and at the school of fine arts under Jean-Baptiste Claude Eugène Guillaume and Pierre-Jules Cavelier. A period of poverty led him to becoming a cabinetmaker, but in 1872, at the age of 24, on the recommendation of fellow sculptor Jules Dalou, he moved to London to work as a studio assistant to Joseph Edgar Boehm. He stayed at the studio until 1890 and influenced Boehm's pupil Alfred Gilbert.

Lantéri's sculptures were mainly modelled in clay before being cast in bronze, though he would also work in stone. He produced portrait busts, statuettes and life size statues. As of 1880 he taught at the National Art Training School in South Kensington, which became the Royal College of Art in 1896, and in 1900 became the College's first Professor of Modelling (1900–10); in this role he was involved with the architectural and decorative sculpture for Sir Aston Webb's Victoria & Albert Museum, London.

Written works
Towards the end of Lantéri's life he wrote a series of three books, explaining the art of human and animal composition in sculpture. First released as a collection of three books, they are now commonly found as two, with the animal sculpture separate from the human form. These books are still common required texts for many sculpture courses. The foreword to the original book was by friend and fellow sculptor Auguste Rodin who refers to Lantéri as "Dear Master"

 Modelling; A Guide for Teachers and Students (three volumes), London, Chapman and Hall (1911)
 Modelling and Sculpting the Human Figure, Dover Publications Inc., new edition (1986)
 Modelling and Sculpting Animals, Dover Publications Inc., new edition (1986)

Notable pupils
 William Kellock Brown
 Benjamin Clemens
 Alexander Carrick
 Francis William Doyle-Jones
 Margaret Giles
 Allen Hutchinson
 Charles Sargeant Jagger
 Gilbert Ledward
 Ruby Levick
 Walter Marsden
 Esther Moore 
 Oliver Sheppard
 Clare Sheridan
 Francis Shurrock
 Lilian Simpson
 Florence Steele
 Albert Toft
 Lillian Wade
 Reginald Fairfax Wells
 Charles Wheeler
 Lucy Gwendolen Williams
 Dorothy Stanton Wise
 Francis Derwent Wood

References

External links

1848 births
1917 deaths
French sculptors
French male sculptors
French medallists
Modern sculptors
People from Auxerre
École des Beaux-Arts alumni
20th-century French sculptors
19th-century French sculptors
19th-century French male artists